Courtney Michelle Coleman (born April 13, 1981) is a former professional basketball player who played for the Connecticut Sun of the WNBA.

Ohio State statistics
Source

Career statistics

Regular season

|-
| style="text-align:left;"|2003
| style="text-align:left;"|Minnesota
| 20 || 0 || 7.1 || .550 || .000 || .467 || 1.1 || 0.1 || 0.4 || 0.1 || 0.7 || 1.8

References

External links
Courtney Coleman WNBA Stats | Basketball-Reference.com

1981 births
Living people
African-American basketball players
American women's basketball players
Basketball players from Cincinnati
Connecticut Sun draft picks
Connecticut Sun players
Forwards (basketball)
Ohio State Buckeyes women's basketball players
21st-century African-American sportspeople
21st-century African-American women
20th-century African-American people
20th-century African-American women